Aliw Broadcasting Corporation is a Philippine broadcasting company. Its corporate office and studios are located at the 5th floor of Citystate Centre, 709 Shaw Blvd., Brgy. Oranbo, Pasig. It is one of the broadcast media assets of the ALC Group of Companies, alongside RPN and Nine Media. Aliw operates a number of radio stations under the Home Radio & DWIZ brands, as well as its only digital television and cable channel, ALIW Channel 23.

History
Aliw was established on May 12, 1991, with the acquisition of DWIZ from Manila Broadcasting Company. The station would later on become among the top-rated news and talk stations in Metro Manila. A year later, it established a number of FM stations across the country. These stations would be later known as Home Radio.

On May 3, 2016, Philippine President Benigno S. Aquino III signed Republic Act No. 10790, an act amending the franchise of Aliw Broadcasting Corporation and Renewing/Extending the term thereof to another twenty-five (25) years that shall take effect on April 13, 2017.

On January 5, 2022, the National Telecommunications Commission awarded Channel 23 to Aliw Broadcasting Corporation under a provisional authority license. The channel was formerly used by Studio 23 and S+A of ABS-CBN Corporation. This marks Aliw's venture into television. On May 6, 2022, the channel launched its broadcast with a live video feed of DWIZ, in which it would be later known as IZTV. On January 30, 2023, it was relaunched as ALIW Channel 23.

On January 30, 2023, Home Radio's provincial stations were relaunched under the DWIZ Regional Integrated News network.

Awards and recognition
The year 2014 served as a milestone for the station as it received several recognitions:
Most Outstanding Radio Station of the Year awarded by the Rotary Club of Manila
Best Magazine Program awarded to Siyasat by the KBP Golden Dove Awards
Citation in the Best AM Radio Station category in the KBP Golden Dove Awards

Awards and recognition for the first half of 2015:
Best Station Radio Category by the Universal Peace Federation
Gawad Ulat for Most Supportive Radio Station by the Department of Social Welfare and Development
Best Documentary Program awarded to Siyasat by the KBP Golden Dove Awards
Lifetime Achievement Award by the KBP Golden Dove Awards given to Ambassador Antonio Cabangon-Chua – founder and chairman emeritus of Aliw Broadcasting Corporation
Journalism Awardee of the Year by the Rotary Club of Manila given to Ambassador Cabangon-Chua – founder and chairman emeritus

Stations

TV

Digital TV

Radio
The following is a list of radio stations owned By Aliw.

DWIZ

Home Radio

Inactive

References

 
Radio stations in the Philippines
Philippine radio networks
Television companies of the Philippines
Television networks in the Philippines
Privately held companies of the Philippines